Tommy Finke (born Thomas David Finke on 4 February 1981 in Bochum, Germany), also known as T.D. Finck von Finckenstein, is a singer-songwriter as well as composer of electronic computer music, theatre music and for modern dance.

Bio 

Tommy Finke was born Thomas David Finke in Bochum, West Germany. Since 1998 he has been on stage, first playing cover versions of Oasis songs, and later his own material. Bands like The Beatles, The Cure, Rio Reiser and The Police are the main influences in his work, as well as German Indie bands like Tocotronic and Die Sterne.

Finke was the lead singer of different project bands before he finally started his own band, called "Stromgitarre", in 1999. However, since he wrote all the music and lyrics, the band was renamed "Tommy Finke & Stromgitarre" in 2003. The band was later renamed again and became "Tommy Finke & Band".

Tommy Finke studied "Elektronische Komposition" at the Folkwang Hochschule in Essen from 2003 on. In 2008, he graduated but decided to continue his studies in order to learn more about modern music.

In 2007, Tommy Finke founded his own record label, "Retter des Rock Records", in order to release his debut album "Repariert, was Euch kaputt macht!", which was released as a vinyl record in 2007 and re-released as a CD Version in 2008.

Tommy Finke and his band took second place at the nationwide German "Jugend kulturell Förderpreis 2008" on 11 November.

In August 2009, Tommy Finke announced there will be a new record entitled "Poet der Affen / Poet of the Apes" in early 2010 due to a record deal with German label Roof Music. The recording sessions for this album started in October 2008.

"Poet der Affen / Poet of the Apes" was released as a double album on 29 January 2010. It contains 13 songs, each recorded in German and English. This is unique for a German singer/songwriter. On the title track of the album, well-known skeptic James Randi is heard speaking an introduction.

"Unkämmbar" was released on 28 March 2013 as a special edition album.

Theatre 
For the play Das goldene Zeitalter – 100 Wege dem Schicksal die Show zu stehlen by Kay Voges Finke composed a complete musical soundtrack. The play premiered on 13 September 2013 at Theater Dortmund.

In 2014 Tommy Finke composed music for 4.48 Psychosis written by Sarah Kane, 
also directed by Kay Voges. Equipped with body-sensors the actors' body-data controls parts of the composition. It premiered on 3 May 2014 at Theater Dortmund.

Releases

Pop music

Discography
 2008 Repariert, was Euch kaputt macht! (10 Songs, Retter des Rock Records, Vinyl, CD and online)
 2010 Poet der Affen / Poet of the Apes (13 songs (26 tracks in German and English), ROOF Music, Indigo)
 2013 Unkämmbar (AREA Entertainment)

Singles/EPs
 2004 1000 Meilen (8-Track-EP, 5 songs, Baukau Media/Rough Trade)
 2007 Repariert, was Euch kaputt macht! – Single (2-track online release, Retter des Rock Records)
 2010 Halt' alle Uhren an / Stop the Clocks (digital release, ROOF Music)
 2012 Canossa
 2012 Kämmbar?
 2013 Heimathafen (Single)

As "Tommy Finke & Miniband":
 2011 Robert Smith in meiner Kneipe (digital release, Retter des Rock Records)

With other artists:
 2012 Yellow (digital Release, Retter des Rock Records, coverversion of Coldplay's song, together with Polyana Felbel and Daniel Brandl)

Remixes for other artists
 2006 R.M.X. 3000 Tommy Finke Remix of the song O.S.T. 3000 of German band Helter Skelter (Band)
 2007 Fieber (Discofox Remix) Tommy Finke Remix of the song "Fieber" of German band Tele (Band)
 2007 Monkey Fingers (Tommy Finke Remix) Remix of the song of the same name by German band Atomic
 2007 The Shelter (Tommy Finke Remix) Remix of the song of the same name by German band Atomic
 2008 "Mausen (Tommy Finke and the cat in the hat Remix)" Remix of the song "Mausen" by German Band MIA.
 2009 The Bomb Song (Tommy Finke Didn't Start The Fire Remix) Remix of the song of the same name by German band Verlen
 2009 Become (Tommy Finke Near The Dunes of Neverland Remix) Remix of the song of the same name by German band Verlen
 2009 I Sold My Heart Today (Tommy Finke Wake Up Mix) Remix of the song of the same name by German band Morning Boy
 2009 Oh Suzanne (Tommy Finke Put Your Make Up on Remix) Remix of the song of the same name by German band Atomic as a free download

Soundtracks
 2004 Wer braucht schon ein Sektfrühstück bei Real Madrid? (Film soundtrack, Baukau Media/Rough Trade)

Released on compilations 
 Rock'n'Roll – Leben on 1Live Zukunftsmusik, 2005
 1000 Meilen on Aufnahmezustand Vol. 4, Zyx Music, 2005
 1000 Meilen (Live) and Um den Schlaf gebracht (Live) on HypoVereinsbank – Jugend kulturell Förderpreis 2008 "Popmusik", HypoVereinsbank, 2008

Film scores 
 Lemmingsfrühling, 2001. Director: Daniel Nipshagen
 Bar Las Jornadas, 2003. Director: Martin Brand
 Lurie, 2003. Szenenmusik. Director: Martin Brand
 Wer braucht schon ein Sektfrühstück bei Real Madrid?, 2004. Director: Ben Redelings
 100 Stunden nonstop, 2005. Director: Ben Redelings
 Unterholz, 2005. Director: Jan Kretschmer
 Nordstadt, 2005. Szenenmusik. Director: Michael Kupczyk
 Die 11 des VFL, 2007. Director: Ben Redelings

Coverversions 
 Du erkennst mich nicht wieder originally performed by Wir sind Helden and Judith Holofernes, 2006
 Ohne dich originally performed by Rammstein, 2007

Released as producer / audio engineer 
 Hosenkrebs Etüde by Hummelgesicht, recorded, produced, and mixed, 2002
 Ich verstehe mein Leben by Sandrakete, mixed and partly recorded, 2007
 Demo by Johannes Zaster Band, recorded, produced, and mixed, 2007

Theatre & Dance 
 Kaspar Hauser und die Sprachlosen aus Devil County by Thorsten Bihegue and Alexander Kerlin at Schauspiel Dortmund, composer and musical director, 2015
 The Return of Das goldene Zeitalter – 100 neue Wege dem Schicksal das Sorgerecht zu entziehen by Alexander Kerlin and Kay Voges at Schauspiel Dortmund, composer and musical director, 2015
 Endstation Sehnsucht by Tennessee Williams at Schauspiel Frankfurt, composer and musical director, 2014
 Reverse_Me by Fabien Prioville at Goethe-Institut Montréal, composer and musical director, 2014
 4.48 Psychose by Sarah Kane at Schauspiel Dortmund, composer and musical director, 2014
 Das goldene Zeitalter – 100 Wege dem Schicksal die Show zu stehlen by Alexander Kerlin and Kay Voges at Schauspiel Dortmund, composer and musical director, 2013

Art Music

Installation art / Musical compositions 
 Meine kleine Nachtmusik, 2005. 4-channel electronic piece, based on samples of a recording of Mozarts Eine kleine Nachtmusik. Produced at the ICEM of the Folkwang Hochschule, Essen-Werden.
 Driver, 2005. Cooperation with video artist Martin Brand.
 Attack, 2006. Cooperation with video artist Martin Brand.
 Bleach, 2006. Cooperation with video artist Martin Brand.
 light emitting idiot, 2007. Cooperation with Florian Mattil, Jan Rusch and Christof Schnelle.
 Swell, 2007. Cooperation with artist Ulrich Ostgathe. Looping Installation.
 Was Es Nicht Ist 1 (Aura-Varianten), 2008. 7-channel electronic piece for 4 loudspeakers and 3 guitar amplifiers, with light composition.
 Wenn ein Werk die Form einer Birne hat, ist es nicht mehr formlos!, 2008. 2-channel tape music, dealing with certain aspects of the music of Erik Satie.

References

External links 
 Official web site for theatre and dance
 Official web site as singer/songwriter Tommy Finke

German singer-songwriters
Living people
German composers
1981 births
Folkwang University of the Arts alumni
21st-century German male singers